César Roman Ibáñez (born 17 June 1999) is an Argentine professional footballer who plays as a left-back for Huracán.

Club career
Ibáñez came through the youth ranks of Huracán, having joined at the age of eight. He was moved into their first-team squad in 2018–19, making his senior debut on 15 May 2019 in a Copa Argentina victory over Unión Sunchales; replacing Christian Chimino after eighty-four minutes at the Estadio Brigadier General Estanislao López. In the succeeding September, under new manager Juan Pablo Vojvoda, Ibáñez made his first appearance in the Primera División by playing the full duration of a four-goal home defeat to River Plate.

International career
Ibáñez was called up to train with the Argentina U19s in February 2018.

Career statistics
.

References

External links

1999 births
Living people
People from Lomas de Zamora Partido
Argentine footballers
Association football defenders
Argentine Primera División players
Club Atlético Huracán footballers
Sportspeople from Buenos Aires Province